Acromyrmex hystrix is a species of leaf-cutter ant, a New World ant of the subfamily Myrmicinae of the genus Acromyrmex.

Distribution
This species can be found in regions including the Amazon and Ecuador.

Subspecies
Acromyrmex hystrix ajax Santschi, 1925
Acromyrmex hystrix hystrix Latreille, 1802

Synonyms 
 Acromyrmex emilii Santschi, 1925
 Atta hystrix Latreille, 1802
 Formica hystrix Latreille, 1802

See also
List of leafcutter ants

References

Acromyrmex
Insects described in 1802
Hymenoptera of South America